Cruckmeole is a small hamlet in Shropshire, England. It is located on the A488, where a lane which connects Cruckmeole to the B4386 crossroads at Cruckton forms a three way junction near to Hanwood. It is within the civil parish of Pontesbury.

The Cambrian Line railway passes close to the village on its way from Shrewsbury to the west Wales coast. There was a junction from which ran the Minsterley branch line, created in 1861, passing through Pontesbury and terminating in Minsterley but this closed, as a result of the Beeching Axe, in 1967.

A residential school, Cruckton Hall, is located near the village.  The building of a former primary school within the village, built 1872 but closed in 1969, now serves as Cruckton Village Hall. A Royal Mail post box is in a wall at the Cruckmeole junction.

The Rea Brook, historically called the Meole Brook, flows through the village.

John Wood Warter (1806-1878), antiquarian and cleric and editor of the works of Robert Southey, was born at Cruckmeole.

See also
 Listed buildings in Pontesbury
 Cruckton

References

External links

Villages in Shropshire